The Snark is a fictional animal species created by Lewis Carroll. This creature appears in his nonsense poem The Hunting of the Snark. His descriptions of the creatures were, in his own words, unimaginable, and he wanted that to remain so.

The origin of the poem

According to Carroll, the initial inspiration to write the poem – which he called an agony in eight fits – was the final line, For the snark was a boojum, you see.

Carroll was asked repeatedly to explain the snark. In all cases, his answer was he did not know and could not explain. Later commentators have offered many analyses of the work. One such likens the contemporary Commissioners in Lunacy individually to the ten hunters, noting that Carroll's favourite uncle, Skeffington Lutwidge, himself a member of the commission had, like the poem's Baker, met his end in a "chasm"—Lutwidge was murdered by an asylum inmate called McKave.

Descriptions of the snark

The poem describes several varieties of snark. Some have feathers and bite, and some have whiskers and scratch. The boojum is a particular variety of snark, which causes the baker at the end of the poem to "softly and suddenly vanish away, and never be met with again".

The Bellman in the poem describes "five unmistakable marks" that identify a snark. One, the snark's flavour; "meager and hollow, but crisp" (apparently like a coat too tight in the waist). Two, it sleeps late into the day, waking near five in the afternoon. Three, it dislikes jokes, especially puns. Four, it likes bathing-machines, and carries them with it wherever it goes. Fifth and last, it is ambitious. The Baker relays his uncle's narration, which says that a snark prepared as a meal is served with greens, and is "handy for striking a light"; the Annotated Snark suggests that this could mean either that its skin is useful for striking matches on, or that it breathes fire.

The domain of the snark is an island filled with chasms and crags, very distant from England. On the same island may also be found other creatures such as the jubjub and bandersnatch. The snark is a peculiar creature that cannot be captured in a commonplace way. Above all, courage is required during a snark hunt. The most common method is to seek it with thimbles, care, forks, and hope. One may also "threaten its life with a railway share" or "charm it with smiles and soap".

See also
 SM-62 Snark cruise missile, and its prospective supersonic successor, the SSM-A-5 Boojum
 Snark (graph theory) graphs named after Carroll's Snark
 Boojum (superfluidity), a phenomenon in physics
 Boojum tree, a desert plant

References

External links
 Lewis Carroll – illustrated Hunting of the Snark

 The Institute of Snarkology

 Lewis Carroll Resources

Animal characters in literature
Fictional characters introduced in 1876
Lewis Carroll characters